The MBB/Kawasaki BK 117 is a twin-engined light utility–transport helicopter. It was jointly developed and manufactured by Messerschmitt-Bölkow-Blohm (MBB) of Germany and Kawasaki of Japan. MBB was later purchased by Daimler-Benz and eventually became a part of Eurocopter, which was later rebranded as Airbus Helicopters.

On 25 February 1977, MBB and Kawasaki signed a cooperative agreement to abandon their independent efforts to design twin-engined general purpose  helicopters in favour of a collaborative venture to development of a new rotorcraft for that role. While the programme's costs were shared equally, the workshare was divided into certain areas of the design. MBB utilised their expertise with the rigid rotor system used on the earlier Bo 105 to develop the majority of the dynamic systems and flight controls, while Kawasaki focused on the airframe, structural elements, and various other components. On 13 June 1979, MBB's flying prototype conducted its maiden flight at Ottobrunn, Bavaria, Germany; months later, it was followed by the Kawasaki prototype at Gifu, Chūbu region, Japan on 10 August 1979.

Each company established their own final assembly line, producing the BK 117 for their respective regions. The BK 117 has proven to be popular for passenger services and VIP-transport, the cabin can be outfitted with various seating configurations, seating between seven and ten passengers. It is also used for a diverse range of operations, such as  aerial crane and sling work, law enforcement, and military transport, and is exceptional as an air ambulance and search and rescue platform. During the 1990s, due to its popularity, a refined derivative, initially marketed as the BK 117 C-2 before being rebranded as the EC 145 and later as the H145, was developed from the BK 117 C-1 version; this improved version of the rotorcraft has since succeeded the original BK 117 in production.

Development

Origins
According to aviation author J. Mac. McCellan, the BK 117 has its origins in an earlier rotorcraft designed and produced by German aerospace manufacturer Messerschmitt-Bölkow-Blohm (MBB), the MBB Bo 105. This helicopter, which proved to be a commercial success, had made use of a revolutionary hingeless main rotor composed of fibreglass, which was developed by German engineer Ludwig Bölkow. Having established a reputation for reliability and safety, during the early 1970s MBB, along with one of its major shareholders, Boeing Vertol, began studying options for producing an enlarged derivative of the type to accompany the Bo 105. However, Boeing soon withdrew from the venture, leading to MBB searching for another partner; this was found in the form of Japanese company Kawasaki Heavy Industries.

On 25 February 1977, MBB and Kawasaki signed an agreement to cooperate on the development of a new rotorcraft. Under the terms of this agreement, the two corporations merged their previously separate projects to produce twin-engined general purpose helicopters, these being the Bo 107 by MBB and the KH-7 from Kawasaki. All of the privately incurred development costs were shared equally between the two partners; in November 1977, the programme received a huge boost when the government of West Germany announced that it would fund half of the costs of development. By April 1978, project definition studies had been completed, enabling the joint venture to proceed with the detail design phase of development.

Separate elements of the design were assigned to each company; MBB were responsible for developing the rotors (these were based on the rigid rotor system previously used on MBB's Bo 105), tailboom, flight controls and hydraulic system while Kawasaki undertook the development of the landing gear, airframe, main transmission, electrical system and other minor components. German vehicle manufacturer BMW acted as a consultant on the styling of the BK 117. As per their agreement, each company established their own final assembly line for the type, on which they would produce the rotorcraft to meet demands within their respective local markets.

Originally, each company intended to construct a pair of prototypes (in actuality, Kawasaki opted to only build a single prototype) which were to be completed by 1979; one for flight testing purposes and the others for tie down testing and static testing. On 13 June 1979, MBB's flying prototype conducted its maiden flight at Ottobrunn, Bavaria, Germany; months later, it was followed by the Kawasaki prototype at Gifu, Chūbu region, Japan on 10 August 1979. The pace of development on the programme had been slower than expected, a problem that was exacerbated by a shortage of skilled manpower that was available at MBB. Although it was originally planned for the rotorcraft's airworthiness certification to be achieved before the end of 1980, German certification was not achieved until 9 December 1982, being quickly followed by the receipt of Japanese certification on 17 December 1982. On 29 March 1983, the type secured the all-important United States Federal Aviation Administration (FAA) certification, clearing it for widespread use.

Further development
During 1983, the initial production version, designated as the BK 117A-1 was first delivered. Improved variants were quickly developed; in early 1985, the BK 117A-3, featuring an increased maximum takeoff weight and an enlarged tail rotor with twisted airfoils, was certified; two years later, the BK 117A-4, equipped with LTS 101-750B-1 engines for improved hot/high performance and increased maximum takeoff weight, along with improvements to the main rotor transmission and tail rotor mast, as well as a larger capacity fuel tank, was introduced. During 1990, MBB's American division launched a dedicated corporate version of the BK 117; it was furnished with a Honeywell-built SPZ-7000 digital automatic flight control system and a cocoon-type interior system; optional extras included a Bendix/King electronic flight instrumentation system (EFIS) and a clamshell cabin door. During 1992, the BK 117C-1, equipped with a revised EFIS panel and an improved environmental control system, along with greater hot-and-high performance, was introduced to service.

At one stage, there was considerable attention paid to the concept of a dedicated militarised variant of the type. During the 1985 Paris Air Show, the concept of an armed attack helicopter derivative, referred to as the BK 117A-3M, was revealed to the general public. As promoted, this variant would have been capable of being armed with launchers for eight Euromissile HOT 2 missiles and a chin-mounted Lucas-built turret for a Browning 12.7mm machine gun, aimed using a helmet-mounted sight. It was also to be equipped with various advanced targeting sensors, including an SFIM APX-M 397 roof-mounted stabilized sight. In order to provide sufficient ground clearance for the gun turret, the use of higher skid landing gear would have also been necessitated.

During the 1990s, as a result of the commercial success of the type, a refined derivative, initially marketed as the BK 117 C-2 prior to its rebranding as the EC 145 and later as the H145, was developed from the BK 117 C-1 version; this improved version of the rotorcraft has succeeded and eventually replaced the original BK 117 in production. In total, 443 BK 117s were manufactured by the two partners; 329 (and two prototypes) were produced by MBB at their Donauworth facility while 111 (and one prototype) were completed by Kawasaki in Japan. during the 1980s, an agreement was formed with Indonesian Aerospace, enabling the type to be produced under license in Indonesia, which was accordingly designated as the NBK 117; however, according to economics author Sören Eriksson, the Indonesian production programme was terminated after only a handful of rotorcraft were completed.

Since exiting production, third parties have produced their own upgrade programmes for existing BK 117s. In 2010, Airwork launched its conversion programme for the type, replacing the original LTS101-750B-1 engine with the newer LTS101-850B-2 engine, increasing both its performance, reliability and safety margins, resulting in the BK117-850D2; by 2016, Airwork had upgraded nearly 50 rotorcraft in this manner.

Design
The MBB/Kawasaki BK 117 is a twin-engined medium utility–transport helicopter. It possessed several attributes that lend itself to performing many different roles, such as twin-engine redundancy, sizable clamshell-shaped rear-facing double doors, and a relatively spacious cabin; one mission to which it was deemed to be particularly suitable was the emergency medical services (EMS). The airframe is composed of rivetted metal, making minimal use of composite materials, and machined to a high standard; in order to free up internal space, both the engines and transmission are positioned above the main cabin. Considerable efforts were made to reduce the weight of the aircraft where possible albeit without compromising the aircraft's structural integrity. The cabin could be outfitted with various interiors in order to suit its purpose, or to incorporate greater comfort levels, which included measures to dampen both noise and vibration.

Early versions of the BK 117 were powered by a pair of Lycoming LTS101 turboshaft engines, rated to generate 550 shp at takeoff with considerable reserve power to guard against a single engine failure. While each engine possesses sufficient power to maintain flight and even takeoff in the event of a single engine being rendered inoperable, the type also has favourable autorotation capabilities. In order to extend their operational lifespan and increase their reliability, MBB tuned the engines to operate at lower-than-standard revolutions per minute (RPM). The engines are regulated using a specialised control system which smoothly and evenly regulate RPM and torque between both engines, even during vigorous manoeuvers. Power management has been greatly eased via the addition of an automatic engine-governor system, allowing pilots to simply monitor the torque and engine temperature gauges. The aircraft can be suitably equipped for flight under instrument flight rules (IFR) as well as for single-pilot operations.

According to aviation publication Flying, as a consequence of its uncommon rigid main rotor system, the BK 117 possessed relatively high stability and manoeuvrability which, amongst other capabilities, reportedly gave the type the ability to perform a steeper approach than any other helicopter in its class. The four-bladed main rotor was smaller and slower-turning than many of its contemporaries, reducing both vibration and noise while also enabling the type to use more compact landing sites. The high-mounted tail boom and tail rotor of the BK 117 also presented several benefits, such as enhanced safety to personnel on the ground. In terms of its flight performance, the type was considered to be suitable for the execution of various aerobatic manoeuvres, such as flying loops and rolls, while retaining such levels of inherent stability that pilots could readily release both the cyclic and collective controls, unlike the majority of rotorcraft. The controls of the BK 117 are heavy and distinctly "un-twitchy". An optional Sperry-built three-axis stability augmentation system also served to improve the rotorcraft's ease of handling.

Operational history

A single BK 117 A-3 (c/n 7106) was leased by the Canadian Forces Air Command for a test program and designated as the CH-143. When the program was over, the aircraft was returned to MBB Canada.

A BK117 helicopter contracted by the New South Wales Rural Fire Service to fight fires crashed on 17 August 2018, the pilot died in the crash.

Variants

BK 117 P-2   (D-HBKA)German prototype, first flown 13 June 1979. Now exhibited at the Bückeburg helicopter museum, Bückeburg, Germany.
BK 117 S-01  (D-HDRF)Initial pre-production prototype. Now preserved on top of the DRF-Headquarters at Stuttgart Airport.
BK 117 P-3/P-5   (JQ0003)Japanese prototype, first flown 10 August 1979. Now exhibited at Kakamigahara Aerospace Museum, Kakamigahara/Gifu, Japan
BK 117 A-1 Powered by two Lycoming LTS 101-650B-1 engines. First flown 23 April 1982.
BK 117 A-3 Introduced in March 1985, the A-3 has a larger tail rotor with improved blades, Yaw CSAS, improved stability (SPAS) and the take-off weight increased to 3,200 kg (7,055 lb).- The Canadian Armed forces leased a single BK 117-A3 for a test program and designated it the CH-143. When the program was over, the aircraft was returned to MBB Canada
BK 117 A-4 Introduced in July 1986, the A-4 has increased transmission limits at take-off power, improved tail rotor head. German aircraft have provision for extra internal fuel, giving enhanced performance.
BK 117 A-3M Military version introduced in 1986. The A-3M is fitted with taller skids and can carry 11 troops. A Browning 12.7 mm (0.5 in) machine gun can be mounted under the fuselage in a Lucas turret with 450 rounds and controlled by a helmet-mounted sight. The A-3M also has outrigger pylons which can hold up to eight HOT II or TOW antitank missiles or a variety of air-to-air missiles, rocket-pods, or forward-firing cannons. Provisions for a doorway gunner's position with a 12.7 mm (0.5 in) gun can also be installed.
BK 117 B-1 Introduced in December 1987, the B-1 is fitted with LTS 101-750B-1 engines to provide increased performance, and a 140 kg (309 lb) increase in payload.
BK 117 B-1C UK-certified version with reduced range and endurance.
BK 117 B-2 Maximum Gross Weight increased to 3,350 kg, 2 x Allied Signal Lycoming LTS101-750B-1 engines fitted as standard, new tail rotor blades, improved "hot and high" performance, take-off/landing limitation increased to 15,000 ft, improved flight performance for: HIGE/HOGE, single engine service ceiling.
BK 117 C-1 Powered by two Turbomeca Arriel 1E engines. Later models may be upgraded to Arriel 1E2 engines.
NBK 117 License-built model produced in Indonesia by Indonesian Aerospace.
BK 117-850D2 Introduced in 2010, the 850D2 variant is an STC (Supplementary Type Certificate) development (i.e., re-engined) of BK  117 B-2 incorporating Honeywell LTS 101-850B-2 engines aimed at improving OEI and Category A performance. Development and certification was conducted in New Zealand by Airwork of Ardmore, NZ, in conjunction with Flight Structures Ltd.
NOTE: All later variants are derived from the BK 117 by Eurocopter Deutschland and later Airbus Helicopters.
The variants BK 117-C2, -D2 and -D3 are therefore better known under its commercial naming convention EC145 and H145 and don't share the same EASA Type Certificate (see EASA Helicopter Type Rating List).

Operators

Military and government

 Fire and Rescue NSW (formerly)
New South Wales Rural Fire Service

 New South Wales Police Force
 Western Australia Police

 Chilean Air Force
 Carabineros de Chile

 Colombian National Armada

 Bundeswehr
Polizei

 
 Hellenic Fire Service - Operates three BK-117C1s.
 
 Prefectural police departments

 Malagasy Air Force
 
 Peruvian National Police

 Ministry of Emergency Situations

 Guardia Civil

 South African Air Force
 South African Police Service

 Riverside County Sheriff's Department (California)

Civil

The majority of the helicopters are operated by various emergency services although it is also operated by private individuals, companies and executive charter operators.

 CareFlight
 Westpac Life Saver Rescue Service
 
 Shock Trauma Air Rescue Society

 ADAC
DRF Luftrettung

 Everett Aviation

Auckland Rescue Helicopter Trust
Life Flight (New Zealand)
 Canterbury West Coast Air Rescue Trust
 Otago Rescue Helicopter Trust

 Rega (air rescue) : 7 H145 since 2018, replacing the EC145

 Daily Air Corporation

 Si Chang Flying Services

 Air Methods
St. Louis Children's Hospital
Orlando Regional Medical Center

Former

 Bophuthatswana Air Force

 Canadian Forces Air Command

 Ciskei Defence Force

 Transkei Defence Force

 Venda Defence Force

Specifications (BK 117 B-2)

See also

References

Citations

Bibliography

 "BK 117...a Terrestrial Space Ship". Air International, Vol 36 No 4, April 1989. Bromley, UK:Fine Scroll. . pp. 163–170.
 Eriksson, Sören. "Clusters and Economic Growth in Asia." Edward Elgar Publishing, 2013. .
 Hatch, Paul. "World's Air Forces". Flight International, 5–11 December 1990. pp. 35–81.
 Hoyle, Craig. "World Air Forces Directory". Flight International, Vol. 182, No. 5370, 11–17 December 2012. pp. 40–64. .
 Lambert, Mark. Jane's All The World's Aircraft 1993–94. Coulsdon, UK:Jane's Data Division, 1993. .
 McCellan, J. Mac. "Paramedic." Flying, February 1986. Vol. 113, No. 2. pp. 62–67. .
 Mlandenov, Alexander. "Russia's Responders". Air International, Vol. 91, No. 6, December 2016. pp. 78–87. .
 Prétat, Samuel. "EC 145 & UH-72." Éditions Minimonde76, 2015. . 
 Scharenborg, Martin. "Fighting the fires". Air International'', Vol. 103 No. 2, September 2022. pp. 68–72. .

External links

 Manufacturer's website
 BK 117 in aeromedical services
 BK 117 factsheet

BK 117, MBB Kawasaki
1970s German helicopters
1970s international civil utility aircraft
BK 117, MBB Kawasaki
BK 117, MBB Kawasaki
1970s Japanese helicopters
Twin-turbine helicopters
Aircraft first flown in 1979
Germany–Japan relations